The San Felipe Hills are a mountain range in Santa Clara County, California, located partly in the city of San Jose.

See also 
 Diablo Range
 Santa Teresa Hills

References 

Mountain ranges of the San Francisco Bay Area
Geography of San Jose, California
Mountain ranges of Northern California